In Greek mythology, Apseudes (Ancient Greek: Ἀψευδὴς means 'truthful' or 'the shiner') was one of the 50 Nereids, sea-nymph daughters of the 'Old Man of the Sea' Nereus and the Oceanid Doris. Her name means 'she who never lies', which like her sister Nemertes, inherited their father's quality of a god who tells the truth.

Mythology 
Apseudes and her other sisters appeared to Thetis when she cries out in sympathy for the grief of Achilles for his slain friend Patroclus.

Notes

References 

 Gaius Julius Hyginus, Fabulae from The Myths of Hyginus translated and edited by Mary Grant. University of Kansas Publications in Humanistic Studies. Online version at the Topos Text Project.
 Homer, The Iliad with an English Translation by A.T. Murray, Ph.D. in two volumes. Cambridge, MA., Harvard University Press; London, William Heinemann, Ltd. 1924. . Online version at the Perseus Digital Library.
 Homer, Homeri Opera in five volumes. Oxford, Oxford University Press. 1920. . Greek text available at the Perseus Digital Library.
Kerényi, Carl, The Gods of the Greeks, Thames and Hudson, London, 1951.

Nereids
Deities in the Iliad